Alpargatas Argentina is the leading textile manufacturer in Argentina, as well as a major local distributor and exporter. Originally established in Argentina in 1883, since 2008 the company is a subsidiary of Brazilian Alpargatas S.A., formerly part of the industrial conglomerate Camargo Corrêa.

History 
Juan Echegaray, a Basque Argentine immigrant, and the textile engineering background of Robert Fraser, a Scottish Argentine immigrant, created a partnership in 1883 for the manufacture of espadrilles (jute-soled canvas footwear favored by laborers for their comfort, durability and low cost). These shoes, called Alpargatas in Spanish, inspired the company's name, Sociedad Anónima Fábrica Argentina de Alpargatas, upon its incorporation in 1885.

Demand for the unassuming footwear grew with the wave of immigration in Argentina during the 1880s, and by 1890, Alpargatas had established a facility in neighboring Uruguay. The fast-growing textile industry led to its diversification into yarn in 1892, and by 1907, a facility was opened in São Paulo, Brazil under the name "Sao Paulo Alpargatas".

The company's growth allowed it to develop larger facilities in 1928 occupying a city block in Buenos Aires' southside Barracas section. This facility began making vulcanized rubber sole shoes in the 1930s under the supervision of engineer Luis Pastorino.

Alpargatas relocated its manufacturing facilities to the southern suburb of Florencio Varela in 1950. This new, 70,000 m² (740,000 ft²) facility allowed it to diversify its product line, leading to the launching of Flecha, its casual footwear brand, in 1962. The establishment of a cotton gin in Sáenz Peña, a town in northern Argentina, allowed Alpargatas to manufacture denim in 1968, allowing it to take advantage to fashion trends in that direction, and a new plant in Aguilares, Tucumán, allowed it to create its Pampero children's footwear line in 1972.

The company's 1975 launch of an athletic shoe line created what became perhaps its most durable brand name in Argentina: "Topper". A new plant in Catamarca led to another commercial success, the "Palette" home fabrics line. The group expanded into banking in 1978 with the acquisition of a 50% stake in the BBVA Banco Francés, a small financial institution which grew from 15 to 62 branches when the company sold its stake to local venture capitalist Eduardo Constantini in 1991.

The longtime CEO of Alpargatas, Eduardo Oxenford, was appointed to head federal receivership of the Argentine Industrial Union after the March 1976 coup. He was named Minister of Industry by the administration of General Roberto Viola in 1981, quitting however within months over policies that adversely affected industry.

Alpargatas began making PVC-soled footwear in 1983, and in 1987, it secured the country's sole license to manufacture Nike shoes. The growing incidence of imports in the local apparel and footwear market during the 1990s prompted the company to open its first factory outlet stores in 1995, and in 1998, it established Dialog, a logistics company, for its transport and warehousing needs.

The company's São Paulo facilities, Alpargatas S.A. were acquired by Camargo Correa Group in the 1980s, and in 2008, the Brazilian subsidiary bought a 35% stake in Alpargatas Argentina. This group had previously acquired Argentine companies Grafa and Loma Negra.

In 2010 the company sold its brand "Pampero" (workwear) to a commercial society formed by local company Cardón and the Karagozian family. In October 2012, Alpargatas sold the bedspread brand "Palette".

On March 19, 2013, Alpargatas S.A. acquired 4,33% of Alpargatas SAIC for US$ 4,7 million therefore the former Brazilian subsidiary controlled 100% of Alpargatas Argentina.

Brands and products 

Notes

Social relevance 
Alpargatas gained notoriety when in 1931 local artist Florencio Molina Campos started to illustrate company's calendars with his gaucho-life paintings. The artist was paid with A$ 6,000 for 12 original paintings. Molina Campos continue his collaboration with Alpargatas until 1936. Commercial relations between the artist and the company renewed for a new production of calendars from 1940 to 1945. It is estimated that a total of about 18 million calendars were printed.

References

Textile companies of Argentina
Manufacturing companies based in Buenos Aires
Manufacturing companies established in 1885
1885 establishments in Argentina
Argentine subsidiaries of foreign companies